Stefanie Wetli (born 4 February 2000) is a Swiss ice hockey player and member of the Swiss national ice hockey team, currently playing with the HT Thurgau Ladies of the Swiss Women's League.

Wetli represented Switzerland in the women's ice hockey tournament at the 2018 Winter Olympics in PyeongChang, the women's ice hockey tournament at the 2022 Winter Olympics in Beijing, and at the IIHF Women's World Championships in 2019, 2021, and 2022. As a junior player with the Swiss national under-18 team, she participated in the IIHF U18 Women's World Championship in 2015, 2016, 2017, and 2018, serving as team captain for the 2018 tournament. At the 2016 Winter Youth Olympics in Lillehammer, she won a bronze medal in the girls' ice hockey tournament with the Swiss under-16 team.

References

External links
 
 

2000 births
Living people
Ice hockey players at the 2018 Winter Olympics
Ice hockey players at the 2022 Winter Olympics
Ice hockey players at the 2016 Winter Youth Olympics
Olympic ice hockey players of Switzerland
People from Meilen District
Sportspeople from the canton of Zürich
Swiss women's ice hockey defencemen
Swiss Women's League players
Youth Olympic bronze medalists for Switzerland